The Buchanan Medal is awarded by the Royal Society  "in recognition of distinguished contribution to the medical sciences generally". The award was created in 1897 from a fund to the memory of London physician Sir George Buchanan (1831–1895). It was to be awarded once every five years, but since 1990 the medal has been awarded every two years.

Since its creation, it has been awarded 28 times, and unlike other Royal Society medals such as the Royal Medal, it has never been awarded to the same individual multiple times. As a result of the criteria for the medal, most of the winners have been doctors or other medical professionals; an exception was Frederick Warner, an engineer who won the medal in 1982 "for his important role in reducing pollution of the River Thames and of his significant contributions to risk assessment".

Two winners have also won a Nobel Prize. The first, Barry Marshall, who was awarded the Buchanan Medal in 1998 "in recognition of his work on discovering the role of Helicobacter pylori as a cause of diseases such as duodenal ulcer, gastric ulcer, gastric cancer and gastritis-associated dyspepsia" and won the Nobel Prize in Physiology or Medicine in 2005. The second, Peter Ratcliffe, won the medal in 2017 "for his ground-breaking research on oxygen sensing and signalling pathways mediating cellular responses to hypoxia", and was awarded the Nobel Prize in 2019.

The first winner of the Buchanan Medal was John Simon, who won his medal in 1897 "for his distinguished services as an organizer of medical sanitary administration in this country, and as a promoter of scientific research relating to public health".

List of recipients 
Source: Royal Society

See also

 List of medicine awards

References
General

Specific

External links 
 Royal Society: Buchanan Medal

Awards established in 1897
Awards of the Royal Society
Medicine awards
1897 establishments in the United Kingdom
1897 in science